Kocjan may refer to:

People
Antoni Kocjan (1902 – 1944), Polish glider constructor
Jure Kocjan, Slovenian road cyclist
Krysia Kocjan (born 1984), Scottish folk singer

Places
Kocjan, Radenci, Slovenia
Zgornji Kocjan, Slovenia
Spodnji Kocjan, Slovenia

See also
 Kocian
 Kocyan
 Kóczián